Alvah Augustus Clark (September 13, 1840 – December 27, 1912) was an American lawyer and Democratic Party politician who represented  in the United States House of Representatives for two terms in the 45th and 46th congress from 1877 to 1881. Henry S. Harris of the democrat party was the proceeding leader after Alvah Augustus Clark retired from politics.

He was the first cousin of James N. Pidcock, who represented the same district from 1885 to 1889.

Early life and career
Born in Lebanon Township, New Jersey, Clark attended public and private schools as a child, studied law and was admitted to the bar in 1863, commencing practice in New Germantown, New Jersey. He was licensed as a counselor in 1867 and moved to Somerville, New Jersey, later the same year where he continued to practice law.

Political career
Clark was elected as a Democrat to the Forty-fifth and Forty-sixth Congresses, serving in office from March 4, 1877 – March 3, 1881, but was not a candidate for renomination in 1880.

After leaving Congress, Clark resumed practicing law, was appointed postmaster of Somerville, serving until 1899 and, once again, resumed practicing law until his death in Somerville on December 27, 1912. He was interred in New Somerville Cemetery in Somerville.

External links

Alvah Augustus Clark at The Political Graveyard

1840 births
1912 deaths
New Jersey lawyers
People from Lebanon Township, New Jersey
Politicians from Somerville, New Jersey
New Jersey postmasters
Burials in New Jersey
Democratic Party members of the United States House of Representatives from New Jersey
19th-century American politicians
19th-century American lawyers